Pung may refer to:

Pung, a term used in Mahjong to indicate a set of three tiles
Pung, a term used in New England for a low, one-horse sleigh with a box-shaped body
Pung Island, a small populated island on the Yellow Sea

People:
Alice Pung, lawyer, the editor of Growing Up Asian in Australia and author of Unpolished Gem
Buyeo Pung (fl. 7th century), one of the sons of King Uija of Baekje
Jackie Pung (1921–2017), American professional golfer who played on the LPGA Tour
Mihkel Pung (1876–1941), Estonian politician

See also
Ping Pung, Hong Kong-based Cantonese pop-rock group
Pung cholom, Manipuri dance
Ta Pung, khum (commune) of Thma Koul District in Battambang Province in north-western Cambodia

et:Pung
fr:Pung